The Cuban Democratic Revolutionary Front was founded in May 1960 by anti-Castro Cuban exiles and was initially headquartered in Mexico. It was known in Spanish as the Frente Revolucionario Democrático (FRD) and was composed of five major anti-Castro groups. The FRD's military wing was called Brigade 2506, which fought in the Bay of Pigs Invasion. Cuban exile Sergio Arcacha Smith was the head of the New Orleans chapter of the FRD. In December 1960, Arcacha Smith opened an office in the Balter Building at 403 Camp Street, Room 207. This was the building where anti-Castro activist and accused JFK assassination conspirator Guy Banister had had his office until July 1960. In October 1961, the FRD was absorbed by the Cuban Revolutionary Council, and Arcacha moved the office to 544 Camp Street for several months. Arcacha was forced out of his position in January 1962 by a group of local anti-Castro exiles.

References

Aftermath of the Cuban Revolution
Opposition to Fidel Castro
Defunct political parties in Cuba
Cuban diaspora

Anti-communist organizations